Tabarteh is a village in Farmahin Rural District, in the Central District of Farahan County, Markazi Province, Iran. At the 2006 census, its population was 1,064, in 251 families.

References 

Populated places in Farahan County